North Carolina's 85th House district is one of 120 districts in the North Carolina House of Representatives. It has been represented by Republican Dudley Greene since 2021.

Geography
Since 2023, the district has included all of Avery, Mitchell, and Yancey counties, as well as most of McDowell County. The district overlaps with the 46th and 47th Senate districts.

District officeholders

Election results

2022

2020

2018

2016

2014

2012

2010

2008

2006

2004

2002

2000

References

North Carolina House districts
Avery County, North Carolina
Mitchell County, North Carolina
Yancey County, North Carolina
McDowell County, North Carolina